Kariz Now (also Romanized as Kārīz Now) is a village in Jannatabad Rural District, Salehabad County, Razavi Khorasan Province, Iran. At the 2006 census, its population was 103, in 21 families.

References 

Populated places in   Torbat-e Jam County